Heroes Are Not Wet Behind the Ears or Les héros n'ont pas froid aux oreilles is a 1979 French comedy film directed by Charles Nemes.

Plot 
Two single men without stories that are cousins, working in the same bank and live in the same dwelling in Paris. Encouraged by their employer to break with a rhythm of monotonous life, they decided to rent a car (a new Ami 8 break ...) Scent of a Woman getaway to visit Bruges. However, their journey is just begun to finally abandoned after meeting a girl who hitchhiked.

Cast 

 Daniel Auteuil as Jean-Bernard
 Gérard Jugnot as Pierre
 Henri Guybet as Bertier
 Anne Jousset as Karine
 Nadia Barentin as Karine's Mother
 Michel Puterflam as Karine's Father
 Patricia Karim as Jacqueline
 Patrick Chauvel as Monsieur Blanquet
 Roland Giraud as The Director
 Josiane Balasko as A Client
 Martine Laroche-Joubert as A Client
 Gérard Lanvin as The Guard
 Jacques Legras as The Foreign Agent
 Michel Blanc as A Passerby
 Bruno Moynot as The Car Renter
 Thierry Lhermitte as The Tire Thief
 Christophe Malavoy as The Driver
 Martin Lamotte as The Bride
 Maaike Jansen as The Bride
 Marie-Anne Chazel as The 2CV Woman
 Christian Clavier as The 2CV Man

References

External links 

1979 comedy films
1979 films
French comedy films
1970s French-language films
1970s French films